This is a list of schools in Portugal.

Aljezur International School
The British School of Lisbon
Colégio Nossa Senhora do Rosário
Camões Secondary School
Carlucci American International School of Lisbon
College of Lamego
Colégio Bartolomeu Dias
Colégio D. Diogo de Sousa
Colégio Internacional Infanta D. Maria de Portugal
Colégio Militar
Colégio Mira Rio
Colégio Moderno
Colégio Planalto
Colégio Pedro Arrupe
Colégio São Tomás
Deutsche Schule zu Porto
Escola da Ponte
Escola Secundária D. Pedro V
Escola Secundária Eça de Queirós (Póvoa de Varzim)
Escola Secundária Manuel Teixeira Gomes
Escola Secundária Poeta António Aleixo
Escola Secundária Sá de Miranda
Externato Senhora do Carmo
International School São Lourenço
Lycée français Charles Lepierre
Oeiras International School
Oporto British School
Pupilos do Exército
Redbridge School
Saint Dominic's International School
Saint Julian's School
Santo António International School
Salesianos de Lisboa
Salesianos do Estoril
St. John de Britto College
Vale Verde International School
Vilamoura International School

See also

Education in Portugal
List of higher education institutions in Portugal

 
Portugal
Portugal
Schools
Schools
Schools